Colors of a New Dawn is the 24th studio album released by Austrian new age musician Gandalf.

Track listing
 Rhythm of the Tides – 6:18
 Bridge of Confidence – 5:29 
 In the Presence of Angels – 4:54
 Iris – 9:05
 From Distant Shores – 7:17
 In the Presence of Angels (Reprise) – 1:41
 Hearts in Celestial Unison – 4:56
 Flowers Along My Way – 2:53
 Colors of a New Dawn – 6:32
 Brighter Than a Star – 7:12

Personnel

Gandalf – acoustic 12-string guitar, classical nylon guitar, electric guitars, bouzuki, saz, piano, Mellotron, keyboards, samplers, percussion
Julia Martins – vocals on "In the Presence of Angels"

References

External links
Colors of a New Dawn @ Amazon.com
Colors of a New Dawn @ Real Music
Colors of a New Dawn @ Groove Unlimited

2004 albums
New-age albums